Sever is a civil parish in the municipality of Moimenta da Beira, northern Portugal. The population in 2011 was 536, in an area of 10.03 km2.

References

Freguesias of Moimenta da Beira